Curcuma rhomba is a monocotyledonous plant species described by John Donald Mood and Kai Larsen. Curcuma rhomba is part of the genus Curcuma and the family Zingiberaceae.

Range
Curcuma rhomba is found in Indo-China.

References 

rhomba